The Gettysburg Times is an American newspaper in Gettysburg, Pennsylvania owned by the Sample News Group. It published daily, except for Sundays, Christmas Day, and New Year's Day.

The Times was founded in 1902 as The Progress, but is also the successor to prior newspapers going back to the Adams Centinel which was founded in 1800 and was the first newspaper in Adams County.

The Gettysburg Times' focus is Adams County news. Its news staff covers area municipal meetings and events and its sports staff covers seven schools - Delone Catholic, Littlestown, Gettysburg, Bermudian Springs, New Oxford, Fairfield, Bermudian Springs and Biglerville. The newspaper is headed by Managing Editor Alex J. Hayes and Publisher Harry Hartman.

In addition to Adams County news, the paper routinely publishes public-interest excerpts from national news sources.

History
In September 1902, Madison Alexander Garvin started The Progress.  By 1905, it was renamed The Gettysburg Times.

The Adams Centinel was founded by Robert Harper in November 1800 as the first newspaper of any kind in the county. It was a weekly.  The wording of "Centinel" was later changed to "Sentinel".  In 1867, the Sentinel combined with the Star (founded in 1828) to become the Star and Sentinel.  The Times and News Publishing Company, then owner of the Gettysburg Times, took over the Star and Sentinel in 1920, and it published as a weekly until 1961.  The Gettysburg Compiler, founded in 1818, was also acquired by the Times' owner.

The Sample News Group, then owner of 12 papers, acquired the paper in early 2013 from the Jones family, after longtime publisher Phil Jones died in 2011.

References

External links
Official Website of The Gettysburg Times
Gettysburg Times Archives at Google News (1909-2009)
The Adams Centinel Archives (1800–05, 1813–60, 1883)
The Centinel (1805-1813)
Gettysburg Compiler Archives (1869-1953)

Daily newspapers published in Pennsylvania
Publications established in 1800
1800 establishments in Pennsylvania